Valentine is a 2001 slasher film directed by Jamie Blanks and starring Denise Richards, David Boreanaz, Marley Shelton, Jessica Capshaw, and Katherine Heigl. Loosely based on the novel of the same name by Tom Savage, the film follows a group of women in San Francisco who are stalked by a killer wearing a Cupid mask in the days leading up to Valentine's Day.

Released theatrically on February 2, 2001, the film was critically panned, with critics deeming it too similar to 1980s slasher films. The film earned $36.7 million on a $29 million budget.

Plot 
At a junior high school St. Valentine's Day dance in 1988 San Francisco, Jeremy Melton, an outcast student, asks four popular girls to dance. The first three girls, Shelley, Lily, and Paige, reject him spitefully and cruelly, while the fourth girl, Kate, politely responds, "maybe later." Their rich friend Dorothy accepts Jeremy's invitation, and they proceed to make out underneath the bleachers. When the school bully Joe Tulga and his friends discover them, Dorothy falsely claims that Jeremy sexually assaulted her. Joe and his friends publicly strip and severely beat Jeremy, and his nose starts bleeding under the distress. It is later revealed Jeremy was expelled and eventually transferred to reform school and juvenile hall, due to Lily, Paige, Shelley and Joe testifying against him for unwanted sexual advances towards Dorothy, and then ended up in a state-run mental institution.

Thirteen years later, in 2001, Shelley, now a medical student at UCLA, is at the morgue one evening studying for her medical exam. After receiving a vulgar Valentine's card in her locker, Shelley discovers someone has taken the place of the cadaver they had been dissecting. After being attacked by someone in a trench coat and Cupid mask, Shelley is cornered in a cooler where she attempts to hide in a body bag, but the killer finds her before slitting her throat. The killer's nose bleeds as she dies.

At Shelley's funeral, Kate, Lily, Paige, and Dorothy are questioned. They admit to not having seen her in some time after she moved from San Francisco to Los Angeles. Paige, Lily and Dorothy subsequently receive obscene cards, each signed "JM".  Lily's card comes with a box of chocolates which she finds are filled with maggots. Meanwhile, Dorothy's boyfriend, Campbell, loses his apartment and temporarily moves in with her at her father's large mansion.

As the girls attend the exhibit of Lily's artist boyfriend Max, they meet Campbell's bitter ex-girlfriend Ruthie, who accuses him of being a con artist. Lily becomes lost at the exhibit and the killer appears, who proceeds to shoot her repeatedly with arrows until she falls several floors into a dumpster. When they have not heard from Lily, the others assume she is in Los Angeles on a work trip. Upon contacting the police, they agree that the culprit can be Jeremy Melton. Dorothy admits to Kate and Paige that she lied to avoid being humiliated and that Jeremy never attacked her; ruining his life by causing him to be beaten and sent to reform school. Meanwhile, Kate's neighbor Gary breaks into her apartment to steal her underwear. The killer catches Gary in the act and hits him with a hot iron, then proceeds to brutally beat him to death with the object.

As Valentine's Day approaches, Dorothy is planning a party at her family's estate. On the morning of the party, the killer murders Campbell with an ax in the basement. The others assume he has simply left Dorothy, angering her, to which Dorothy believes that they are jealous and still look at her as the "fat girl" of the group. She confesses Jeremy never assaulted her. After coming to the party to confront Dorothy with the truth about Campbell, Ruthie is thrown through a shower window by the killer, who then impales her neck on the glass. At the party, Paige is attacked and trapped in a hot tub by the killer. The killer impales her in the shoulder with an electric drill before throwing it into the water, electrocuting her.

The party disintegrates when the power cuts out, cause Paige was killed, and Dorothy and Kate argue over who the killer is. Kate claims that Campbell could be a suspect because they do not know anything about him or where he is, while Dorothy counters by accusing Adam, Kate's recovering alcoholic on-off boyfriend, who is now a journalist. After being told by Lily's boyfriend that she did not arrive in Los Angeles as planned, Kate realizes she is also probably dead and calls Detective Vaughn who was assigned to the case. After dialing the number, she follows the sound of a ringtone outside the house and discovers Vaughn's severed head in the pond. Kate becomes convinced that Adam is actually Jeremy, disguised by reconstructive surgery, and goes back into the house, only to find Adam waiting for her. To her surprise, he asks her to dance. Kate becomes frightened and flees. She runs through the house, discovering Dorothy's room trashed and Paige and Ruthie's corpses. She locates a gun, but the Cupid masked killer jumps out from the darkness and sends them both tumbling down a staircase. The killer arises and is shot to death by Adam.

As a shocked and confused Kate apologizes profusely, Adam pulls off the killer's mask to reveal Dorothy. Adam forgives Kate, explaining that childhood trauma can lead to lifelong anger and some people are eventually forced to act on that anger, referring to Dorothy. As Kate and Adam wait for the police to arrive, they hug and Adam says he has always loved her. Moments later, when Kate closes her eyes, Adam's nose begins to bleed, revealing that he is in fact Jeremy Melton (and also the actual killer having knocked out Dorothy and put her in the costume), who set everything up to ruin Dorothy's reputation and exact revenge.

Cast

Production

Conception 
While Warner Bros. had acquired the rights to the Tom Savage novel in May 1998, the project was later transferred to Artisan Entertainment with producer Dylan Sellers and writers Wayne & Donna Powers, with the latter of the two writers himself initially attached to direct.

The original script had a different tone from the book and was set on a college campus. The project went into turnaround to Warner Bros., was rewritten by Gretchen J. Berg & Aaron Harberts and Wayne Powers stepped down as director for the studio to find a suitable new director to take the helm for the film. Richard Kelly was originally offered the chance to direct, but turned the offer down to work on his own film that he wrote and directed himself called Donnie Darko and was eventually replaced by Jamie Blanks, who did his own filmmaking work for the 1998 horror-comedy film Urban Legend. Hedy Burress auditioned for the role of Dorothy Wheeler, and Tara Reid was considered for the role, but it was given to Jessica Capshaw instead. However, Blanks wanted Burress to star in the film and cast her as Ruthie Walker. Jessica Cauffiel originally auditioned for Denise Richards's role of Paige. In the original cast, Jennifer Love Hewitt was to play Paige Prescott.

Filming 
Valentine was shot on location in Vancouver, British Columbia, with principal photography commencing on July 10, 2000, and concluding on September 8. Boreanaz shot all his scenes in less than two weeks. Katherine Heigl only had three days to shoot her scenes as she was already committed to the television series Roswell.

Blanks later said in an interview: "Forgive me for [Valentine]. A lot of people give me grief for that, but we did our best".

Release 
In promotion of the film, Warner Bros.'s official website featured digital e-card valentines that visitors could send via email, and stars David Boreanaz and Katherine Heigl—both well known at the time for their roles in the series Angel and Roswell, respectively—appeared at the Los Angeles Comic Book and Science Fiction Festival.

Valentine had its Hollywood premiere at Hollywood Post No. 43, American Legion, on February 1, 2001. It earned $20,384,136 in the United States and Canada and a total gross of $36,684,136, allowing the film to surpass its $29 million budget.

Critical reception 
On Rotten Tomatoes the film holds an approval rating of 11% based on 79 reviews, with an average rating of 3.40/10. The website's critics consensus reads: "Valentine is basically a formulaic throwback to conventional pre-Scream slasher flicks. Critics say it doesn't offer enough suspense or scares to justify its addition to the genre."  Audiences polled by CinemaScore gave the film an average grade of "D+" on an A+ to F scale.

Mick LaSalle of the San Francisco Chronicle gave the film a middling review likening to a 1980s-style slasher film, but praised the performances, writing: "Valentine isn't scary, but it is unsettling; not ultimately satisfying, but arresting in the moment. Part of the credit has to go to the ensemble. The actresses are vivid, and the characters they play are clearly delineated". Ben Falk of the BBC gave the film two out of five stars: "Let's face it - we all know what's going to happen and director Blanks (Urban Legend) offers up few surprises. There's the host of red herrings of which none really bite, creative deaths, girls running around screaming and then being incredibly thick, but a distinct lack of gratuitous nudity, which would have at least brightened up the landscape".

Kevin Thomas of the Los Angeles Times gave the film a positive review, calling the film a "smart, stylish horror picture that offers a fresh twist on the ever-reliable revenge theme and affords a raft of talented young actors solid roles that show them to advantage". Dennis Harvey of Variety gave the film a mixed review, noting: "Looking good but lacking much in the way of personality or gray matter — rather like its characters — Valentine is a straightforward slasher pic that’s acceptably scary until a weak finale". Maitland McDonagh of TV Guide awarded the film one out of five stars, calling the film "a throwback to the formulaic, holiday-themed stalk-and-slash pictures of the early '80s — but why it took four writers to adapt Tom Savage's generic genre novel is thoroughly baffling". Elvis Mitchell of The New York Times also felt the film was formulaically structured, writing: "The worst kind of mystery is one in which nobody cares who the killer is. Even the cast of Valentine doesn't seem that concerned, and their fictional lives are at stake. When it's hard to hear the dialogue because the audience is laughing, it's clear that Valentine doesn't even succeed on its own limited terms."

In a 2015 retrospective review, the online horror publication Icons of Fright published a retrospective review of the film, defending the spirit of the film and its thematic handling of the holiday's mythological aspects.

Home media 
Valentine was released on both DVD and VHS by Warner Home Video on July 24, 2001. Scream Factory released the film on Blu-ray on February 12, 2019.

Soundtrack 
The musical score for Valentine was composed by Don Davis. The soundtrack also includes the songs "Pushing Me Away" by Linkin Park, "God of the Mind" by Disturbed, "Love Dump (Mephisto Odyssey's Voodoo Mix)" by Static-X, "Superbeast (Porno Holocaust Mix)" by Rob Zombie, "Valentine's Day" by Marilyn Manson, and "Opticon" by Orgy. This soundtrack compilation was lampooned in a sketch by Saturday Night Live, which humorously pointed out that many of the bands featured on it were not only unknown to a mass audience but have oddly nonsensical names.

References

External links 
 Official website
 
 
 

2001 films
2001 horror films
2000s mystery horror films
2000s slasher films
American mystery horror films
American slasher films
American psychological thriller films
American psychological horror films
Canadian horror films
Canadian slasher films
Films scored by Don Davis (composer)
Films about bullying
American films about revenge
Films based on horror novels
Films set in 1988
Films set in 1998
Films set in San Francisco
Films shot in Vancouver
Films about mass murder
Valentine's Day in films
Village Roadshow Pictures films
Holiday horror films
Warner Bros. films
Films directed by Jamie Blanks
2000s English-language films
2000s American films
2000s Canadian films